Bermagui may refer to:

Bermagui, New South Wales
Bermagui River
HMAS Bermagui, a commissioned auxiliary minesweeper operated by the Royal Australian Navy during World War II
MSA Bermagui, a non-commissioned auxiliary minesweeper operated by the Royal Australian Navy during the 1990s